Morisset is a commercial centre and suburb of the City of Lake Macquarie in New South Wales, Australia.

Morisset may also refer to:

David Morisset (disambiguation)
Edric Norfolk Vaux Morisset (1830–1887), colonial police officer 
James Morisset (1780–1852), penal administrator 
Jean-Marie Morisset (born 1947), French politician 
Pierre Morisset (born 1943), Canadian surgeon
Renée Morisset, (1928–2009), Canadian pianist

See also

Prix Gérard-Morisset
Morrissette (disambiguation)
Morissette (disambiguation)
Morrissey (disambiguation)